The Kid from Gower Gulch is a 1950 American Western film directed by Oliver Drake and written by Elmer Clifton. The film stars Spade Cooley, Bob Gilbert, Wanda Cantlon, Jack Baxley, Billy Dix and Joe Hiser. The film was released on January 15, 1950, by Astor Pictures.

Plot

Cast          
Spade Cooley as Spade Cooley
Bob Gilbert as Walt Banning
Wanda Cantlon as Peggy Andrews
Jack Baxley as Uncle Bill White
Billy Dix as Ed
Joe Hiser as Shorty 
Bob Curtis as Tortilla 
Stephen Keyes as Craig Morgan
William Val as Bart Leeson

References

External links
 

1950 films
American Western (genre) films
1950 Western (genre) films
Astor Pictures films
Films directed by Oliver Drake
American black-and-white films
1950s English-language films
1950s American films